The 1978 Arizona gubernatorial election took place on November 7, 1978, for the post of Governor of Arizona. Democrat Bruce Babbitt defeated Republican nominee Evan Mecham. Babbitt was the former Attorney General of Arizona, but after the death of Governor Wesley Bolin, Babbit became governor. Bolin himself ascended to office from the position of Secretary of State, meaning his replacement, Rose Mofford was not eligible to the office as she was not elected. This drama of exchanging office would continue after Babbitt's term came to an end, as Mofford would become governor and succeeded Evan Mecham, Babbitt's challenger, in 1988.

Until 2022, this was the last gubernatorial election where a Democratic governor was elected during the tenure of a Democratic president.

Democratic primary

Candidates
Bruce Babbitt, incumbent Governor
Dave Moss, perennial candidate

Withdrew
Bill Schulz, businessman (endorsed Babbitt)

Results

Republican primary

Candidates
Charles King
Jack Londen, businessman
Evan Mecham, perennial candidate

Results

General election

Results

References

1978
1978 United States gubernatorial elections
Gubernatorial
November 1978 events in the United States